Jesse Levis (born April 14, 1968) is an American Major League Baseball scout and former Major League Baseball player. He played for the Cleveland Indians and Milwaukee Brewers between 1992 and 2001.

Career
After starting as a catcher at Northeast High School in Philadelphia, he accepted a baseball scholarship to the University of North Carolina. In 1987 and 1988, he played collegiate summer baseball with the Orleans Cardinals of the Cape Cod Baseball League and was named a league all-star in 1988.

Levis was selected by the Cleveland Indians in the 4th round of the 1989 MLB Draft. He became a journeyman catcher, playing for the Indians in 1992, 1993, 1994, 1995, and 1999.  He also played for the Milwaukee Brewers in 1996, 1997, 1998, and 2001.  He played Minor League Baseball with not only the Indians and Brewers organizations, but also the Tampa Bay Devil Rays, Atlanta Braves, Cincinnati Reds, Philadelphia Phillies, and New York Mets organizations.  He last played professional baseball in 2004 with the Norfolk Tides.

After retiring, he was hired on November 7, 2006 to be a scout for the Boston Red Sox. He scouted for the Red Sox for two seasons.
Levis is Jewish.

References

External links

Stats at MLB.com

1968 births
Living people
Baseball players from Philadelphia
Boston Red Sox scouts
Buffalo Bisons (minor league) players
Canton-Akron Indians players
Cleveland Indians players
Colorado Springs Sky Sox players
Jewish American baseball players
Jewish Major League Baseball players
Kinston Indians players
Louisville Bats players
Milwaukee Brewers players
Milwaukee Brewers scouts
Major League Baseball catchers
Orleans Firebirds players
Philadelphia Phillies scouts
21st-century American Jews
North Carolina Tar Heels baseball players